Blue Beret Camp, is a base camp and headquarters located at the former Nicosia International Airport on the west side of the city of Nicosia, on the Mediterranean island of Cyprus, which forms the headquarters of the United Nations Peacekeeping Force in Cyprus (UNFICYP).

History
The camp was established within the United Nations Buffer Zone in Cyprus in 1964 to provide a command centre and residential accommodation for troops of the seven contingents serving with the United Nations Peacekeeping Force in Cyprus ('UNFICYP'). In 1972 Kurt Waldheim, Secretary-General of the United Nations visited the camp and in 2001 Bertie Ahern, the Irish Taoiseach, visited the camp.

Wayne's Keep 
Close by is Wayne's Keep, a Commonwealth War Graves Commission cemetery which provides graves primarily for aircrew who died during the Second World War.

References

United Nations operations in Cyprus